Johnny Weltz (born 20 March 1962) is a Danish retired road bicycle racer.  He rode most of his career for the Spanish  team.

In 1985 he won silver at the world championship for amateurs.  The high point of his career was his victory at stage 19 (a mountain stage) of the 1988 Tour de France, and was 54 overall.  He also won a stage in Vuelta a España the same year.

Weltz was most recently a directeur sportif with Team Slipstream.

Major results
Sources:

1985
 2nd  Road race, UCI Amateur World Road Championships
 8th Overall Milk Race
 9th Overall Tour of Ireland
1986
 8th Overall Milk Race
1987
 1st Grand Prix La Marseillaise
 1st GP de Plumelec-Morbihan
 6th Grand Prix de Rennes
 7th Overall Tour du Limousin
 7th Bretagne Classic
 8th Overall Route d'Occitanie
 9th Overall Étoile de Bessèges
 9th Overall Tour of Ireland
 9th Critérium des As
1988
 1st Stage 15 Vuelta a España
 1st Stage 19 Tour de France
 3rd Overall Tour du Limousin
 4th Subida a Urkiola
1989
 1st  Road race, National Road Championships
 1st Stage 1 Tour of the Basque Country
 7th GP Villafranca de Ordizia
 9th Overall Tour de l'Avenir
1990
 2nd GP de la Libération (TTT)
 7th road race, UCI World Road Championships
1991
 1st Stage 2 (TTT) Vuelta a España
 1st Stage 7 Vuelta a Asturias
 1st Stage 1 (TTT) Volta a Catalunya
 2nd TTT GP de la Libération
 2nd Circuito de Getxo
 9th Milan–San Remo
1992
 1st Clásica de Almería
 1st Stage 1 Vuelta a Mallorca
 9th Overall Tour de Picardie
1993
 1st GP Miguel Induráin
 1st Stage 2 TTT Paris–Nice

Grand Tour general classification results timeline

References

External links

1962 births
Living people
Danish male cyclists
Danish Tour de France stage winners
Cyclists from Copenhagen